Pink Cadillac is the sixth album by American folk singer and songwriter John Prine, released in 1979.

Recording
Pink Cadillac was produced by Knox Phillips and Jerry Phillips.  Their father, legendary Sun Records  founder Sam Phillips, produced two of the album's tracks.  Recording took place at Sam Phillips Recording Studio in Memphis between January and May 1979.  The album features Prine indulging his love for early rock and roll, with the singer telling David Fricke in 1993, "I wanted to do something noisy, something like if you had a buddy with a band and you walked into his house and you could hear 'em practicing in the basement."  Although the album may have come as a surprise to some of his fans, Prine had recorded songs with rock and roll arrangements on his previous albums.

In the album's liner notes Prine wrote, "What we tried to achieve here is a recording of a five-piece band with a vocalist playing and singing good honest music."  Later the singer recalled, "We ended up with something like five hundred hours of tape - and took the best of what we had, and Asylum just about had a heart attack."

Composition
As Prine biographer Eddie Huffman observes, "For the first time in his recording career, lyrics were clearly a secondary concern; he was now focused much more on rhythm and the raw feel of the tracks. Prine wrote or co-wrote only five of the ten songs on Pink Cadillac, the singer opting to include some of the classic rock and roll songs that he had loved when he was a kid growing up in Chicago.  These include Arthur Gunter's "Baby, Let's Play House", made famous by Elvis Presley, and Charles Underwood's "Ubangi Stomp".   Prine was one of the first artists to cover the Roly Salley classic "Killing The Blues" and duets with Billy Lee Riley on "No Name Girl", a song Riley co-wrote with Cowboy Jack Clement.   Pink Cadillac also features a stone country arrangement of the Floyd Tillman tearjerker "This Cold War With You".

In the Great Days: The John Prine Anthology liner notes, Prine recalls that "Automobile" was inspired by Elvis Presley's first record: "I think I was playing "That's All Right, Mama" on my guitar and putting my own words to it."  "Saigon" tells the story of a Vietnam vet who is probably suffering from PTSD and is unsuccessfully adjusting to civilian life.  "Saigon" and "How Lucky" features Sam Philips producing.  In the A&E Biography episode on the producer's life Prine joked, "Sam thought my voice sounded so awful that he would stick around to see if he could maybe help fix it."  Prine added that on "Saigon", Phillips intentionally blew the tubes out of guitarist John Burns' amplifier so he could get the sound of "pieces of hot metal flying through the air."  In the Great Days anthology, Prine recalls that when Phillips "used the talk-back in the studio, he even had the slap-back echo on his voice.  You felt like Moses talking to the burning bush."

The release of Pink Cadillac coincided with Prine's appearance on the PBS concert series Soundstage, where he is backed by his band performing several songs from the album, including "Automobile" (which features clips of Prine driving a 1950s-era car around the Maywood, Illinois neighborhood where he grew up), "Ubangi Stomp", "No Name Girl" (again featuring Riley, who also performs "Red Hot" with Prine), "Saigon" and the nostalgic "How Lucky".  Prine performs "How Lucky" on acoustic guitar with John Burns on the porch of his childhood home and offers a few thoughts on the song, asking Burns "Did you ever have a whole lotta growing pains when you got somewhere around the age of thirty?   I never thought that age mattered much, I just thought that age was just something that was there every year, like Christmas...Seems like I started going back over everything I'd ever done and wondered if I wanted to do it for the next thirty or not...That's where this kind of started."

Reception

The album received mostly negative reviews upon release.  Writing in Rolling Stone in 1979, David Marsh deemed it "an almost unqualified disaster" and insisted that Prine "has never sung such a half-assed grab bag of songs, partly because he wrote so few of them (and is in no way a classic interpreter of any material except his own), partly because the outside stuff he chose is so thoroughly mediocre."

Village Voice critic Robert Christgau wrote, "Prine has never rocked harder. But he's slurring his vocals like some toothless cartoon bluesman emulating an Elvis throwaway — related to the Sun sound, I guess, but perversely."

Writing for Allmusic, critic William Ruhlman says of the album "Prine wrote only five of the ten songs...and even though the covers were of high caliber — notably Roly Salley's "Killing the Blues" and Arthur Gunter's "Baby Let's Play House," a song Elvis Presley did at Sun — Pink Cadillac was a good idea that went slightly awry in the execution. If Prine had had the songs as well as the studio, it would have been among his best."  The album has become a fan favorite, however, with Prine revealing to David Fricke in 1993, "I get people now coming up and saying they're sorry for not liking it then, that they've gone back to it and really like it now."

Track listing
All tracks composed by John Prine; except where indicated.
"Chinatown" – 2:24
"Automobile" – 4:23
"Killing The Blues" (Roly Salley) – 4:35
"No Name Girl" (Jack Clement, Billy Lee Riley) – 3:31
"Saigon" (John Prine, John Burns) – 3:16
"Cold War (This Cold War With You)" (Floyd Tillman) – 4:11
"Baby Let's Play House" (Arthur Gunter) – 3:30
"Down By the Side of the Road" – 5:03
"How Lucky" – 3:38
"Ubangi Stomp" (Charles Underwood) – 2:41

Personnel
John Prine – vocals, guitar
Tom "Pickles" Piekarski – bass
Billy Lee Riley – guitar, backing vocals
Angie Varias – drums
John Burns – guitar, backing vocals
Leo LeBlanc – guitar, steel guitar
Howard Levy – harmonica, keyboards, saxophone
Jerry Phillips – guitar
Helen Duncan – backing vocals
Phyllis Duncan – backing vocals
Beverly White – backing vocals
Helen Bernard – backing vocals

Charts

References

1979 albums
John Prine albums
Albums produced by Sam Phillips
Asylum Records albums